The gulden (alternatively florin; , , ,) was the currency of the lands of the House of Habsburg between 1754 and 1892 (known as the Austrian Empire from 1804 to 1867 and the Austro-Hungarian Monarchy after 1867), when it was replaced by the Austro-Hungarian krone as part of the introduction of the gold standard. In Austria, the gulden was initially divided into 60 kreuzers.  The currency was decimalized in 1857, using the same names for the unit and subunit.

Name
The name Gulden was used on the pre-1867 Austrian banknotes and on the German language side of the post-1867 banknotes. In southern Germany, the word Gulden was the standard word for a major currency unit. After 1867 Austrian coins used the name Florin. "Florin" is derived from the city of Florence, Italy where the first florins were minted, from 1252 to 1533.

History
The gulden first emerged as a common currency of the Holy Roman Empire after the 1524 Reichsmünzordnung in the form of the Guldengroschen. In the succeeding centuries the gulden was then defined as a fraction of the Reichsthaler specie or silver coin.

As of 1690 the gulden used in Southern Germany and the Austrian Empire adhered to the Leipzig standard, with the gulden worth th a Cologne Mark of fine silver or  reichsthaler specie coin, or 12.992 g per gulden. Below is a history (in terms of grams of silver) of the standards of the Austro-Hungarian gulden from 1690 until the gold standard was introduced in 1892.
 A comparison with the lower-valued South German gulden is also included. The course of value of the gulden before 1618 is found under Reichsthaler.

The gulden departed from the Leipzig standard in the 1730s when the gold-silver price ratio dropped from 15 to 14.5, prompting several states to reissue their gulden in cheaper gold. The Austro-Hungarian gulden then departed from its South German counterpart after it valued the Carolin d'or of 7.51 g fine gold at 9 Austrian gulden, versus 11 gulden in Southern Germany. This made the Austrian gulden is worth 7.51/9 = 0.834 g fine gold, or 0.834x14.5 = 12.1 g fine silver.

As Austria was the leading state of the Holy Roman Empire, it initiated the currency convention of 1754 in which the Conventionsthaler replaced the reichsthaler specie as the standard currency of the Holy Roman Empire. The South German gulden was set lower at 24 guldens per Cologne mark of silver, or 2.4 guldens per Conventionsthaler, or 9.744 g. The North German Reichsthaler currency unit was then defined as  Gulden or  a Conventionsthaler, or 17.5392 g. Following the winding up of the Holy Roman Empire in 1806, the Gulden became the standard unit of account in the Habsburg lands and remained so until 1892. The gulden was subdivided in 60 kreuzer, each of 4 pfennig or 8 heller.

In 1857, the Vereinsthaler was introduced across the German Confederation and Austria-Hungary, with a silver content of  grams. This was slightly less than  times the silver content of the Gulden. Consequently, Austria-Hungary adopted a new standard for the gulden, containing two-thirds as much silver as the Vereinsthaler, or  g. This involved a debasement of the currency of 4.97%. Austria-Hungary also decimalized at the same time, resulting in a new currency system of 100 kreuzer = 1 gulden and  gulden = 1 Vereinsthaler.

In 1892 the Austro-Hungarian gulden was replaced by the krone, with each krone containing  grams of gold, at a rate of 1 gulden = 2 kronen (gold-silver ratio 18.2).

In 1946 the Hungarian forint (magyar forint) was re-introduced and remains the official currency in Hungary.

Coins

Austria
Copper coins were initially issued in denominations of 1 heller ( kreuzer) up to 1 kreuzer, with silver coins in denominations from 3 kreuzers up to 1 Conventionsthaler. The Turkish and Napoleonic Wars led to token issues in various denominations. These included a 12 kreuzer coin which only contained 6 kreuzers worth of silver and was later overstruck to produce a 7 kreutzer coin. In 1807, copper coins were issued in denominations of 15 and 30 kreuzers by the Wiener Stadt Banco. These issues were tied in value to the bank's paper money (see below). The coinage returned to its prewar state after 1814.

Vereinsthaler issues ceased in 1867.

Hungary
Following the forint's introduction, Hungary issued relatively few coins compared to Austria, but the Kingdom of Hungary started minting its own gold forints in 1329. All issues ceased in 1794 and did not resume until 1830, when silver coins of 20 krajczár and above were issued. Only in 1868, following the Austro-Hungarian Compromise of 1867, did a full issue of coins for Hungary begin. Denominations were fewer than in Austria, with copper , 1 and 4 krajczár, silver 10 and 20 krajczár and 1 forint, and gold 4- and 8 forints.

Paper money

Between 1759 and 1811, the Wiener Stadt Banco issued paper money denominated in gulden. However, the banknotes were not tied to the coinage and their values floated relative to one another. Although the notes did have a slight premium over coins early on, in later years, the notes fell in value relative to the coins until their value was fixed in 1811 at one fifth of their face value in coins. That year, the Priviligirte Vereinigte Einlösungs und Tilgungs Deputation ("Privileged United Redemption and Repayment Deputation") began issuing paper money valued at par with the coinage, followed by the "Austrian National Note Bank" in 1816 and the "Privileged Austrian National Bank" between 1825 and 1863. In 1858, new notes were issued denominated in "Austrian Currency" rather than "Convention Currency".

From 1866, the K. K. Staats Central Casse ("Imperial and Royal State Central Cashier") issued banknotes, followed from 1881 by the K. K. Reichs Central Casse which issued the last Gulden banknotes, dated 1888.

The banknotes after Austro-Hungarian Compromise of 1867 that were issued by the Austro-Hungarian Bank had their value that was guaranteed with gold as enacted in the Banking Act. State notes were issued by the treasury and had no such cover.

References

External links 

Geldschein.at - Picture gallery of Austrian gulden banknotes

Currencies of Austria
Gulden
Economic history of Austria